This is a list of aqueducts in the Roman Empire. For a more complete list of known and possible Roman aqueducts and Roman bridges see List of Roman bridges.

Aqueducts in the Roman Empire

See also
 List of aqueducts
 Map of Roman Aqueduct in modern Turkey

Notes

References

Further reading
  183 pages.

External links 
 List of Roman aqueducts
 The atlas project of roman aqueducts

Aqueducts
Aqueducts in the Roman Empire